Long a may refer to:
 Long a, the traditional name of a vowel in English: see  
 the letter Ā.